Robert Graham Cameron (born 19 March 1963) is a former Australian state politician. He represented the electorate of Bendigo West in the Victorian Legislative Assembly. He served as the Minister for Police and Emergency Services and Minister for Corrections (2006-2010 in the third Bracks Ministry and the Brumby Government).

Educated in Bendigo at government schools, Cameron also attended the University of Melbourne where he obtained a law degree. He practised as a solicitor in Bendigo from 1985 until he was first elected to Parliament in 1996.

In the first Bracks Ministry (1999-2002), Bob Cameron was the Minister for Local Government, WorkCover and TAC.  In the second Bracks Ministry (2002-2006) he was Minister for Agriculture . While Minister for Local Government, he sacked the then-controversial Melbourne City Council.  As WorkCover Minister he reintroduced common law rights for seriously injured workers.

In 2005, he proposed and implemented a ban on pit bull dogs, after a series of attacks by the animals which Cameron claimed were highly dangerous, a threat to children and the elderly.

On 7 October 2010, Bob Cameron announced his retirement from politics at the upcoming November 2010 election. He resigned the same day as fellow minister Peter Bachelor, both resignations were unexpected at the time.

In September 2022, Cameron was appointed by the Victorian Government as Chair of WorkSafe Victoria.

He is married with one daughter and two sons.

References

1963 births
Australian Labor Party members of the Parliament of Victoria
Living people
Members of the Victorian Legislative Assembly
21st-century Australian politicians
University of Melbourne alumni
University of Melbourne alumni politicians
20th-century Australian politicians
Victorian Ministers for Agriculture